The 1998 Air Force Falcons football team represented the United States Air Force Academy in the 1998 NCAA Division I-A football season.

Schedule

Personnel

Rankings

Awards and honors
Frank Mindrup
3rd Team All-American (AFF)
2nd Team All-WAC

References

Air Force
Air Force Falcons football seasons
Western Athletic Conference football champion seasons
Oahu Bowl champion seasons
Air Force Falcons football